The Reformation movement in Kerala refers to a socio-cultural movement that began towards the end of 19th century and led to large scale changes in the social outlook of the southern Indian state of Kerala.

Background
The foundations of social changes in Kerala go back to the 16th century. 
The development of the modern form of the Malayalam language and the creation of the Bhakti movement under the influence of authors like Thunchaththu Ezhuthachan helped break the monopoly of the Brahmins over literature and knowledge.

The arrival of Europeans, beginning with the Portuguese followed by the Dutch and English, became a catalyst for these changes. The arrival of missionaries from European nations lead to a rise in educational institutions in Kerala.

The social hierarchy in Kerala was based on caste, unlike the four-fold varna division found elsewhere in India. In Kerala, the Malayali Brahmins formed the top and priestly class, while the Samantha Kshatriya and Nairs formed the other upper, military, and ruling classes. Beside the Hindu upper caste Brahmin and Nair communities, there were also Christians and Muslims, everyone else from Ezhavas to Pulayas were considered lower castes. These lower castes had to abide untouchability and ritualistic pollution norms enforced by the upper castes. The changes in the political order of Kerala with the establishment of centralized monarchies in Travancore and Cochin, leading to the decline of the old feudal order, were also a crucial factor that set the stage for reformation. The Mysorean invasion of Kerala (1766–1792) shook the hold of the caste hierarchy in Kerala. Although the Mysoreans tried establishing an Islamic State in Malabar, their advances were thwarted by the Britishers.

In contrast with North India, renaissance in Kerala was driven by lower castes. Major reformist leaders like Narayana Guru, Ayyankali and others belonged to caste groups considered lower in the social settings of 19th century Kerala. Hence, most of them emphasized the need for abolition of the caste system rather than its reformation.

Leaders
Prominent leaders of Kerala reformation include :
  Mannath Padmanabhan
 Narayana Guru
 Chattampi Swamikal
 Ayyankali 
 Sahodaran Ayyappan
 Dr. Padmanabhan Palpu
 Kumaran Asan
 Dr. Ayyathan Gopalan
 Brahmananda Swami Sivayogi.
 Vaghbhatananda
 Nitya Chaitanya Yati
 Nataraja Guru
 VT Bhattathiripad
 Kuriakose Elias Chavara
 C. V. Kunhiraman
 Sayyid Sanaullah Makti Tangal
 Vakkom Moulavi

Timeline of revolts and movements
1813–1859 : Channar revolt
1836      : Formation of Samatwa Samajam by Ayya Vaikundar
1846      : First Catholic Sanskrit school founded by Kuriakose Elias Chavara
1864      : "School (pallikkoodam) along with Church" by Kuriakose Elias Chavara
1888      : Aruvippuram consecration by Narayana Guru
1892      : Swami Vivekananda visits Kerala
1893      : Dr. Ayyathan Gopalan instituted Brahmosamaj to Kerala region.
1893      : "Villu vandi" agitation lead by Ayyankali
1896      : Ezhava memorial submitted to Srimoolam Thirunnal
1898      : First Branch of Brahmosamaj established in the Kerala region by Dr. Ayyathan Gopalanat Calicut.
1900      : Sugunavardhini movement founded by Dr. Ayyathan Gopalan. worked to foster human values in children, attract children to his social activities, protect the rights of women, and provide education to girls.
1903      : SNDP formation
1907      : Formation of Sadhujana Paripalana Sangham by Ayyankali
1909      : Formation of Depressed Classes Mission by Ayyathan Gopalan for the upliftment of Harijan and Dalit communities and provided education.  He established Lady Chandawarkar elementary school for Dalit education
1909      : Formation of Prathyaksha Raksha Daiva Sabha by Poykayil Johannan
1915      : "Kallu Maala"(Stone chain) agitation led by Ayyankali
1917      : "Misra Bhojan" (community feast) organised by Sahodaran Ayyappan
1919      : Formation of Namboothiri yuvajana Sangham under V. T. Bhattathiripad
1924      : Branch of Brahmosamaj established at Alappuzha by Dr. Ayyathan Gopalan.
1924      : Vaikom Satyagraha 
1928      : Brahmomandir constructed at Poonthoppu, kommady, Alappey.
1929      : Launch of  Yukthivadi magazine 
1931-1932 : Guruvayur Satyagraha
1935      : Founding of Yukthivadi Sangham by M.C. Joseph and Panampilly Govinda Menon
1936      : Temple Entry Proclamation

Renaissance leaders & Timeline

Kuriakose Elias Chavara (1805–1871)

Father of literacy in Kerala, school along with every church system, Pidiyari system

Born in a Syro Malabar Saint Thomas Syrian Christian family from Kainakary, Alappuzha
1831     : Founded CMI, Carmelites of Mary Immaculate, India's first Christian priest committee
1846     : Established the first printing press, St. Joseph's Press, without foreign support in Kerala at Mannanam. This was the third in India. First book published was Jnanapeeyusham.
1986     : Declared beatified
2014     : Declared canonized on 23 November
Jeevitham thanne sandesam - visudha chavarayude jeevitham written by M.K. Sanu

Vaikunda swamikal / Ayya vaikundar (1809–1851)

Mudichoodum perumal

The first social reformer in Kerala
1800s    : Famous disciple, Thycaud Ayya
1800s    : Sama panthi Bhojanam
1823      : Became leader of the Upper Cloth revolt, which lead to the 1859 Channar revolt
1836      : Founded Samatva Samajam
1838      : Imprisoned in Singarathoppu jail by Swathi Thirunnal for calling him "ananthapuri devil", calling Travancore the "rule of black devils" and the British the "rule of white devils."
"jathi onn, matham onn, kulam onn, daivam onn, lokam onn"

Thycaud Ayya / subharayan (1814–1909) [Guru of great Gurus']

Shivaraja yogi, Supperintent ayya, Hadayogopadeshta, pandi parayan,

1800s    : Panthi bhojanam
1800s    : Saiva prakasha sabha 
1800s    : Famous disciples; Narayana Guru, chattambi swami, Ayyankali, kerala varma, Raja ravi varma
" intha ulakathile ore oru jathi than, ore oru matham than, ore oru kadavul than"
1984      : Thycaud Ayya Mission was formed at Trivandrum.

Chattampi Swamikal (1853-1924)

1881      : Met Nanu Asan (Guru) at aniyoor temple
1892      : Met swami vivekananda
main works     : jeevakarunya niroopanam, kristhumath niroopanam,  kristhumatha chethanam, vedadhikara niroopanam, pracheena   malayalam, advaitha chintha padhathi,  aadibhasha.

Sree Narayana Guru (1856–1928)

Naanu asan, The second Buddha,

1881      : Guru started school at anju thengu
1887      : Built Aruvippuram temple
1888      : Aruvippuram consecration by Narayana Guru
1898      : Vavoottu yogam, which was considered as the predecessor of SNDP Yogam, was formed this year
1903      : Formation of SNDP by guru, who later became the first and permanent president.  (1st secretary; Kumaranasan, 1st vice president; Dr. Palpu)
1904      : Founded Sivagiri Mutt
1911      : Declared as the National Saint in the census report of the Travancore
1913      : Advaita ashram at aluva
1916      : Founded Sree Narayan seva ashram at kanchipuram
1916      : Started Sanskrit school at aluva
1918      : Visited Sri Lanka for the first time
1924      : Visited vaikom satygraha
"oru jaathi, oru matham, oru daivam manushyanu"

Dr. Ayyathan Gopalan (1861–1948)

 Social reformer widely known as "Darsarji" also as "Darsar Sahib". ("Darsar" (ദർസർ) meaning Doctor)
 "Raosahib" highest civilian award honour and title given by British.
Social reformer of Kerala, physician (doctor), writer, chief surgeon, medical school professor, superintendent and in charge of hospitals all over South India (during British rule).
Founder of Sugunavardhini Movement (സുഗുണവർധിനി പ്രസ്താനം) and popularized Brahmosamaj in Kerala.
1893       :Instituted Brahmasamaj in Kerala.
1898      :Populated Brahmo Samaj in Kerala region (first branch at Calicut, now Ayathan School which runs under the patronage of Brahmosamaj at Jail Road, Calicut)
1900    : Founded the Sugunavardhini movement to foster human values in children and ignited reform activities to protect the rights of women, children, and the downtrodden sections of society such as Harijan and Dalits in Kerala while providing them with an education.
1909     :Founded Depressed Classes Mission , for the upliftment of downtrodden masses sucha as Dalit and Harijan community.
Established Lady Chandhawarkar Elementary School, educating girls and underprivileged sections of society for free. 
Conducted MisraBhojanam and MisraVivaham through Sugunavardhini movement and Brahmosamaj.
1900s     : Titled his favorite disciple Karat Govinda Menon as "Brahmananda" Sivayogi and P. Kunjiraman as "Brahmavadhi" for involvement in Brahmosamaj activities. Vaghbhatananda was also his favorite disciple who later founded Athma vidya sangam.
1904      : Translated Brahmo Dharma (ബ്രഹ്മധർമ്മ) (known as the Bible of Brahmo Samaj) into Malayalam, originally written by Debendranath Tagore
1901       : Published his first musical drama book Saranjiniparinayam.(സാരഞ്ജിനി പരിണയം)
1903        : Published his second musical drama book Susheeladukham.(സുശീലാദുഃഖം)
1917       : Highest civilian award given by British government and given the honor title "RAOSAHIB" for tireless service done for society and mankind.
 Rabindranath Tagore described him as the "RajaRam Mohan Roy of Kerala" during the annual Brahmo conference.
1924       : Opened second branch of Brahmosamaj at Alappuzha Brahmomandir constructed on 1928 at Poonthoppu.
works      : Propagated his reform activities by conducting dramas, public awareness campaigns, and also through his writings. Saranjiniparinayam & Susheeladukham (musical drama), Plaguefarse (drama) were his famous dramas which were put on by Kottakkal P.S.Warier nadaka sangam (P.S.V. Natyasangham) throughout Kerala for many years.
Famous disciples: Bhramananda swami Sivayogi, Vaghbhatanandaguru, Brahmavadhi P. Kunjiraman

Agamananda Swami (1896–1961)

Krishnam Nambyathiri

1935        : First asram founded - Sanadhana Dharma Vidhyarthi Sangam
1936        : Established Kerala unit of Sree Rama Krishnasram
1900s      : Active member of Ramakrishna mission in Kerala unit
1900s      : Started Sanskrit school Brahmanandodayam
1900s      : Started the magazine 'Prabudha Keralam'

Ananda Theerthan (1905–1987)

Anada Shenoy

1900s     : Direct disciple of Sree Narayana Guru
1933       : Founder of Jathi Nashini Sabha
1933       : first president of Jathi Nashini sabha was K. Kelappan.

Brahmananda shiva yogi / Karat Govinda menon (1852–1929)

'Guru of Atheists', purusha simham, Swami of alathur

Born at Palakkad
Started his reform activities through Brahmosamaj founded by Dr. Ayyathan Gopalan. Dr. Gopalan titled Karat Govinda menon as Brahmananda Sivayogi for his tireless service done through Brahmosamaj. Sivayogi was one of the favorite disciples of Dr. Gopalan.
1893       : Founded 'Siddha rasam' at Alathur
1899       : Stree vidya poshini book to spread awareness of women's education
1918       : Formed Ananda Maha Sabha
1900s     : Founded "Ananda Matham" religion
1900s     : Famous disciple - Vagbatanandan

Vagbhatanandan / V.K. Gurukkal (1885–1939)

Vyleri kunjikannan, balaguru

Born in Patyam, Kannur
Started his reform activities through Brahmosamaj founded by Dr. Ayyathan Gopalan in the year 1898 at Calicut. Vaghbhatananda was the favorite disciple of Dr. Gopalan who wrote the book Kausallya Gopalan as a tribute to Kausallyammal, wife of Dr. Gopalan, who was the backbone behind his reform activities.
1906      : Tathva prakashika Ashramam Kozhikode
1917      : Founded Athma vidya sangam at Vatakara, whose slogan was "unaruvin, aghileshane smarippin, kshanamezunnelpin, aneethiyod ethirpin"
1921      : Abhinava keralam The journal of Atma vidya sangam 
1900s    : Became disciple of Sree Narayana Guruhis
1900s    : founder of ULCCS (uraalunkal Labour Contract Coperative Society)  CurrentlyThe Largest Labour contract in India
1927      : Preethi Bhojanam
works     : Abhinava keralam, adyathma yudham, atma vidya kahalam,    Prarthananjali,  kotiyoor ulsava paatu, shivayogi vilasam,

Arattuppuzha Velayudha Panicker (1825–1874)

kallissery Velayudha Chekavar, panicker Title was given by Maharaja of Travancore,

He actually belongs to Ezhava community

1860      : Founded "Kallissery Kadhakali Yogam" art form to break the savarna monopoly.
1800s     : Mukkuthi agitation 
1800s     : Achipudava agitation at Kayamkulam
1874      : Got killed by Upper caste men during a boat travel at Kayamkulam.

Kurumban Daivathan (1880–1927)

Naduvathamman

1917       : Hindu Pulaya Samajam
1900s      : Navodhansthinte surya thejass (Babu Thomas)

Pampadi John joseph (1887–1940)

1921        : Founded Travancore cheramar maha sabha
1900s       : Magazine Sadhu jana Doothan
1900s       : Cheruma Boy book

C. V. Kunhiraman (1871–1949)

1911        : Kerala Koumudi from mayyanad, ideas of Guru published first time in koumudi
1900s       : Ezhava koumudi
"openion is not an iron pestle"

Mahathma Ayyankali (1863–1941)

Ghandiji called him 'pulaya raja' and 'untiring warrior', Indira Gandhi called him 'Great son of India',

'Aali kathiya theepori', Father of modern Dalit, known as Kerala's Spartacus.

born at venganoor
1893      : Villu vandi samaram (right to use the public roads by the lower cast)
1904      : Started school for pulays at venganoor.
1907      : Sadhujana paripalana sangam
1909      : South India's First organized rebellion (karshaka samaram)
1911       : First Harijan member to enroll in Sree moolam praja sabha 
1915       : Leader of Kallu mala Samaram (perinaatu lahala)   (right to use ornaments other than stone-made ornaments by the lower cast)
1915        : Leader of Thonnooramandu samaram (ooruttambalam lahala / pulaya lahala)  (right to study along with upper cast children)
1916        : Kandala lahala ( ayyankali fired the school at ooruttambalam,  where He tried to get admission for a lower caste girl named Panchami)
1980        : Indira Gandhi unveiled Ayyankali Statue at vellayambalam, architect Ezra David.

Dr. Padmanabhan Palpu (1863–1950)

Padmanabhan, 'Political father of Ezhava community'

1800s       : First Medical graduate from Ezhava community
1800s       : Served as Jail superintent in Mysore
1882        : Met Swami vivekananda at Mysore.
1800s       : The book " Treatment of Thiyyas in travancore"
1891        : The third signature in Malayali memorial (Mass petition to Sree moolam maharaja)
1896        : Founded Greater Ezhava association
1896        : Founded 'Travancore Ezhava Sabha'
1896        : Sep 3, Ezhava Memorial was submitted to Moolam thirunnal (signed by 13176 members)
1900        : Second Ezhava Memorial was Submitted to Lord Curzon
1903        : First vice president of SNDP
1900s       : Malabar economic Union was founded.
1900s       : Nataraja Guru, son of Dr. Palpu, founded the Sree Narayana Gurukulam.
1950        : Died on 25 January the day before Republic Day.

Kumaranasan(1873–1924)

kumaru, sneha gayakan, ashaya gambheeran, leelavathi called him 'divya kokilam',

Joseph mundassery called him Viplavathinte Shukra nakshatram.

Born in Kayikkara
1907      : Veena poov
1909      : First poet to become member of travancore legislative council.
1922      : Only poet to become Mahakavi without writing a Mahakaavyam.
1924      : Last work " Karuna " 
1924      : Died in accident of the 'redeemer' boat in pallana river
Works     : Duravastha (aboutmalabar kalapam)  leela, prarodhanam, chandala bikshuki

Sahodaran Ayyappan / K. Ayyappan (1889–1968)

Born in Cherai, vypin, ernakulam.
1917     : Sahodara sangam
1917     : Misra bhojanam under sahodara sangam at cherai
1900s    : Became disciple of Sree Narayana Guru
1900s    : Formation of Vidya poshini sabha
1938     : Socialist party Established 
1964     : Sree Narayana Sevika Samajam in Aluva.
Weeklies : Velakkaran, yukthivaadi, sahodaran
Works    : Kaasi mahatmyam, sahodari kurathi.
" No caste, No religion, No god for man."

Pandit Karuppan(1885–1939)

shankaran, sahithya kudeeram, Lincoln of Kerala,

kerala varma called him 'vidwan', maharaja of cochin called him 'Kavi thilakam'.

Born in cheranalloor, ernakulam
1904       : Wrote "Jathikkummi" first book in kerala to criticise the caste system.
1907       : Found Araya samajam
1925       : Nominated as a member of the cochin Legislative council.

T.K. Madhavan (1885–1930)

"Megha Jyothis"

1902       : Ezhava association was started
1900s      : The founder of Temple entry movement
1900s      : Undeniable leader of Eradication of untouchability
1915       : Started Deshabhimani News Paper From Kollam
1923       : Only Malayali to attend INC session at Kakkinada,    Presented a resolution on Eradication of untouchability.
1924        : Main leader of Vaikkom Satyagraha.

Vakkom Abdul Khadar Moulavi (1873–1932)

The father of Muslim renaissance in Kerala

1905       : swadeshabhimani news paper started from Anjutheng, tvm on Jan 19
1906       : Magazine Muslim
1918       : Magazine Al-Islam
1922       : Formed Kerala Muslim Aikya Sangham at Kodungallur, thrissur
1931       : Formed Islamic Publishing House.
1931       : Magazine Deepika
1900s     : Formed Islam Dharma Paripalana Sangham based on SNDP model.
1900s     : Formed Dharma Poshini sabha 
works     : Quran Translation, Islam matha sidhantha Samgraham, dau-u-saheb

Swadeshabhimani Ramakrishna pillai (1878–1916)

Keralan (pen name)

1800s       : Became first editor of Magazine Malayali
1906        : Became editor of Swadeshabhimani News paper
1910        : Elected to Sree Moolam praja sabha from Neyyattinkara
1910        : Deported to Thirunalveli on Sep 26 by Diwan - P Rajagopalachari for criticising News against him and also for writing against government at the Time of Moolam thirunnal. Newspaper was banned
Works       : Biography of Karl marx & Gandhiji first time in Malayalam,   auto Biography Ente Naadukadathal, vrithantha pathra pravarthanam (considered as the Bible of Kerala Journalism)

K. Kelappan  (1889–1971)

A K Gopalan (1904-1977) AKG

 Born in Perelassery
1931        : Volunteer captain of Guruvayoor Satyagraha
1936        : Pattini jatha (kannur to madras)
1937        : Malabar jatha (calicut to Travancore)
1900s       : First leader of opposition in Loksabha
1958        : First Indian coffie House started
1960        : Karshaka jatha / peasant march (kazargod to travancore)
1900s       : Crusader of downtrodden
1900s       : Ente jeevitha kadha, in the cause of the people,(auto biography)    manninu vendi, ente poorvakala smaranakal,

See also
Caste system in Kerala
Kerala model

References

 R.Ponnu, Sri Vaikunda Swamigal and the struggle for Social Equality in South India, Madurai, 2000.

Anti-caste movements
Social history of Kerala